Hillcrest High School is an accredited public high school in Strawberry, Arkansas, United States. Hillcrest High School is one of five public high schools in Lawrence County and the only high school of the Hillcrest School District.

Academics
The assumed course of study follows the Smart Core curriculum developed by the Arkansas Department of Education (ADE). Students complete regular coursework and exams and may select Advanced Placement (AP) courses and exams that may lead to college credit. Hillcrest High School is accredited by the ADE.

Athletics 
The Hillcrest High School mascot is the Screamin' Eagles with red, white and blue serving as the school colors.

For 2012–14, the Hillcrest Screamin' Eagles compete in the 1A Classification—the state's smallest classification—from the 1A 2 North Conference administered by the Arkansas Activities Association. The Screamin' Eagles participate in golf (boys/girls), basketball (boys/girls), baseball, softball, archery, shooting sports and track (boys/girls).

References

External links
 

Public high schools in Arkansas
Schools in Lawrence County, Arkansas